Census in Armenia is a population census conducted in Armenia about every 10 years with the purpose of capturing exact data on demographics in the country.

Demographic trends 
While Armenians formed a consistent majority, Azerbaijanis were historically the second largest population in the republic under Soviet rule (forming about 2.5% in 1989).  However, due to hostilities with neighboring Azerbaijan over the disputed region of Nagorno-Karabakh virtually all Azeris emigrated from Armenia.  Conversely, Armenia received a large influx of Armenian refugees from Azerbaijan, thus giving Armenia a more homogeneous character.  This forceful population exchange also affected the Christian Udi people of Azerbaijan, many of whom were perceived as Armenians due to close cultural ties between both peoples.  The number of Udis residing in Armenia has increased from 19 in 1989 to about 200 by 2006.

Additionally since independence, several other ethnic groups have emigrated especially Russians (who decreased from 51,555 persons in 1989 to 14,660 in 2001), Ukrainians (8,341 in 1989 to 1,633 in 2001), Greeks (4,650 in 1989 to 1,176 in 2001), and Belarusians (1,061 in 1989 to 160 in 2001).  The numbers of Yazidis, Kurds, and Assyrians have remained consistent for the most part (though approximately 2,000 Assyrians have left Armenia between 1989 and 2001). Although Georgians were historically counted among the largest ethnic groups in modern Armenia, their numbers have dropped substantially since the 1989 Soviet census when they numbered 1,364 persons.

Russian Empire censuses

Soviet Armenia censuses

1 Includes numbers of both Yazidi and Kurdish populations which were counted separately in the 1926 census but were combined in subsequent censuses.

Republic of Armenia censuses
The first census in Armenia after the dissolution of the Soviet Union was conducted by the Government of Armenia's National Statistical Service during the period of October 10–19, 2001. The census night was October 10. The National Assembly adopted the law "On Census" in 1999, but the government lacked the necessary funds to carry out the count immediately. According to Armenian law, a census must take place every 10 years. 

The last population census in Armenia was scheduled in 2020.

References

See also
Demographics of Armenia

Armenia
Demographics of Armenia